The Z1021 or  Mirsharai–Narayanhat (Fatikchhari) Road is a transportation artery in Bangladesh, which connects Dhaka–Chittagong Highway from Mirsharai with Regional Highway R151 at Narayanhat.

Junction list

The entire route is in Chittagong District.

Markets crossed
 Harinmara

See also
 N1 (Bangladesh)

References

National Highways in Bangladesh